Lincoln High School is a public high school located in the Goose Hollow neighborhood of Portland, Oregon, United States. It was established in 1869 as Portland High School.

Student profile
In the 2017–2018 school year, Lincoln High School's student population consisted of 71.1% White, 10.4% Asian, 8.3% Hispanic, 1.3% African American, 0.2% Native American, 0.1% Pacific Islander, and 8.4% mixed race. About 91% of its students live within the school's neighborhood.

In 2008, 89% of the school's seniors received a high school diploma. Of 372 students, 330 graduated, 34 dropped out, four received a modified diploma, and four were still enrolled in high school the following year. For the 2010–11 school year, Lincoln had the highest overall graduation rate among Portland Public high schools, at 84 percent. About 90% of its Asian-American students graduated on time, as did 88% of Latino students. However, only 38% of its African-American students graduated on time, which was the worst rate in the district.

Activities

Lincoln's constitution team has won 23 state championships and six national titles.

History

19th century

With an initial enrollment of 45 students, the school was established in 1869 as the Portland High School in the North Central School sited on Block 80 of Couch's Addition (bounded by NW 11th & 12th and Couch & Davis Streets). The principal was J.W. Johnson. The high school moved from the top floors of the North Central School to the Central School in 1873 (located where Pioneer Courthouse Square is today) and moved again to the Park School (block bounded by Park, 10th, Madison, and Jefferson (now the Portland Art Museum)) in 1878. The first building to be known as Lincoln High School was built at SW 14th and Morrison in 1885, but was still named West Side High School at the time. The land for the 14th and Morrison School was given to the school district by Mrs. Simeon G. Reed (wife of the founder of Reed College) in 1869 and the building was designed by William Stokes, an architect who had recently moved to Portland from Oakland, California. The building was situated in the block bounded by 14th, Morrison, Lownsdale (now 15th) and Alder Streets.

In 1889, a "very successful" night school program was started at the first purpose-built building at SW 14th and Morrison.

20th century

The school was renamed Lincoln High School in 1909, and moved to the 45-room South Park Blocks location (now known as Lincoln Hall) when construction was completed in 1912. The building occupies the block bounded by Market & Mill Streets and Park & Broadway. (After the 1912 move, the old building of 1885 was used by the Girls' Polytechnic School. In fall 1928, that school moved to a new building on the east side, leaving the 1885 building vacant, and it was demolished by 1930.)

In 1937, the school had grown to 1,580 students and 53 teachers. In 1972, it had 1,253 students, 7% of whom were black (a contemporary report noted they were mostly "voluntary transfers"); 4.3% of the students were on welfare.

Also in 1937, the Portland Police Bureau's anti-leftist "Red Squad" interrogated a student union leader. This rapidly led to the disbanding of the Silver Shirts-affiliated Red Squad.

Due to the baby boom and passing of a $25 million building levy by the school district in 1947, a new high school was slated. The existing building was sold to the Vanport Extension Center (now Portland State University) in April 1949 for $875,000, with the intention that the high school would not leave for "at least two years." Land was cleared for the school by June 1950 on the former Jacob Kamm House property.

21st century 

Lincoln is slated to be completely rebuilt as part of a $790 million bond measure passed in 2017. Construction is set to begin in the summer of 2020, with students returning at the beginning of the 2023 school year. The new building is being built where the field used to sit, leaving the old building available to attend in the interim years.

Notable alumni

Sports
 Peter Baum, 2012 Tewaaraton Trophy winner and first overall pick of the 2012 Major League Lacrosse draft
 Ron East, professional football player
 Harry Glickman, sports promoter, "father of professional sports" in Oregon
 Jim Grelle, runner
 Swede Halbrook, former professional basketball player
 Peter Jacobsen, professional golfer
 Elmer Kolberg, professional football player
 Mickey Lolich, professional baseball player, 1968 World Series MVP Award winner
 Johnny Pesky, professional baseball player 
 Richard Sanders, world champion and two-time Olympic silver medal-winning wrestler
 Matthew Sheldon, professional soccer player

Music
 Marion Bauer, composer, educator, and critic
 Kathleen Hanna, composer, writer, activist and member of Bikini Kill 
 Robert Mann, violinist and founding member of Juilliard String Quartet
 Tye North, musician and former member of Leftover Salmon
 Elliott Smith, singer-songwriter
 Nate Query, musician and member of The Decemberists

Media
 Mel Blanc, voice actor
 Rick Emerson, radio personality
 Matt Groening, creator of The Simpsons and Futurama (in fact, the building has a poster of every single character from The Simpsons, signed by Groening)
 Colleen Miller, actress
 Rebecca Schaeffer, actress
 Lori Singer, actress and cellist
 Alex Frost, actor

Other
 Daniel E. Barbey, Vice Admiral, USN
 Chris DeWolfe, businessman, Myspace
 Aaron Director, professor who helped develop the Chicago school of economics
 S. David Griggs, astronaut
 David E. Jeremiah, Admiral USN, Vice-Chairman of the Joint Chiefs of Staff under Colin Powell
 Kenneth Koe, pharmacologist & neuroscientist, co-inventor of anti-depressant drug Zoloft
 Hans A. Linde, attorney and justice on the Oregon Supreme Court
 Alfred E. Mann, entrepreneur and philanthropist (brother of notable alumnus Robert Mann)
 Chet Orloff, director of Oregon Historical Society, professor, writer
 Richard Neuberger, journalist and U.S. Senator from Oregon
 Mark Rothko, modern artist
 Gary Snyder, poet
 Arthur Dewey Struble, Admiral, USN
 Nathan F. Twining, Chairman of the Joint Chiefs of Staff
 Ted Wheeler, 53rd Mayor of Portland

References

External links

 Official website

1869 establishments in Oregon
Educational institutions established in 1869
High schools in Portland, Oregon
International Baccalaureate schools in Oregon
Goose Hollow, Portland, Oregon
Portland Public Schools (Oregon)
Public high schools in Oregon